Califa is a former settlement in Madera County, California. Califa still appeared on maps as of 1918.

A post office operated at Califa from 1912 to 1915.

References

Former settlements in Madera County, California
Former populated places in California